Cloyd's Creek Presbyterian Church is a historic church in Greenback, Tennessee.

Its Greek Revival building was completed in 1872, replacing an older log building. It is a gable-front frame building and has a full-width portico with Doric columns on its main facade. It is the only 19th-century Greek Revival church in Blount County and was added to the National Register of Historic Places in 1989.

References

External links
 Cloyd's Creek Cemetery Association

Presbyterian churches in Tennessee
Churches on the National Register of Historic Places in Tennessee
Churches completed in 1872
19th-century Presbyterian church buildings in the United States
Buildings and structures in Blount County, Tennessee
Greek Revival church buildings in Tennessee
National Register of Historic Places in Blount County, Tennessee